The Mission Argillite is a geologic formation in Washington (state). It preserves fossils dating back to the Permian period.

See also

 List of fossiliferous stratigraphic units in Washington (state)
 Paleontology in Washington (state)

References
 

Permian geology of Washington (state)